Igor Yurin is a Kazakh football player. He has made two appearances for the Kazakhstan national football team.

References

Living people
1982 births
Kazakhstani footballers
Kazakhstan international footballers
Kazakhstan Premier League players
FC Shakhter Karagandy players
FC Zhenis Astana players
FC Okzhetpes players
FC Tobol players
FC Irtysh Pavlodar players
FC Atyrau players
Association football midfielders
Sportspeople from Almaty